Nymphicula cheesmanae is a moth in the family Crambidae. It was described by David John Lawrence Agassiz in 2014. It is found on the New Hebrides.

Description
The wingspan is 10–12 mm. The base of the forewings is brown with a whitish antemedian fascia. The median area is scattered with brown scales. The base of the hindwings is brown with a white subbasal fascia and a brown antemedian fascia with yellow coloration near the dorsum.

Etymology
The species is named for Evelyn Cheesman.

References

Nymphicula
Moths described in 2014